The National Security and Investment Act 2021 (c. 25) (NSIA) is an act of the Parliament of the United Kingdom which was announced in the Queen's Speech on 19 December 2019 and is a piece of legislation introduced in the House of Commons on 11 November 2020. Its Second Reading took place on 17 November 2020, and its Third Reading was scheduled for Wednesday 20 January 2021.

The NSIA was sponsored in the Commons by Alok Sharma, who was Secretary of State for Business, Energy and Industrial Strategy in the Second Johnson ministry.

Commentary
While approaching its Third Reading, the Daily Telegraph was of the opinion that the "debate about foreign takeovers of companies central to the national interest - from technology to infrastructure - is certain to be a pulpit for argument between China hawks and doves."

References

International trade
Foreign relations of the United Kingdom
Economy of the United Kingdom
United Kingdom Acts of Parliament 2021
2021 in British law
2021 in British politics